Tom Anthony Rhys Scriven (born 18 November 1998) is an English cricketer. He made his Twenty20 debut for Hampshire against Gloucestershire in the 2018 t20 Blast on 17 August 2018. Prior to his T20 debut, he was named in England's squad for the 2018 Under-19 Cricket World Cup.

In December 2019, he was awarded a Rookie contract for Hampshire during the 2020 season. He made his first-class debut on 15 August 2020, for Hampshire in the 2020 Bob Willis Trophy. He made his List A debut on 22 July 2021, for Hampshire in the 2021 Royal London One-Day Cup.

References

External links
 

1998 births
Living people
English cricketers
Hampshire cricketers
Cricketers from Oxford
Berkshire cricketers
Leicestershire cricketers